Mycerinopsis lacteola is a species of beetle in the family Cerambycidae. It was described by Hope in 1841.

References

Apomecynini
Beetles described in 1841